Caldwell High School four-year public secondary school in Caldwell, Idaho, the only traditional high school in the Caldwell School District #132. The building is on South Indiana Avenue near the corner of Ustick Road, across from the local YMCA. The school colors are blue, white, and gold and the mascot is a cougar.

Athletics
Caldwell competes in athletics in IHSAA Class 4A in the Southern Idaho Conference (4A). Caldwell traditionally competed with the largest schools in the state in Class 5A (formerly A-1).

State titles
Boys
 Basketball (1): 1967 (A-1, now 5A) 
 Baseball (1): 1983 (A-1, now 5A) (records not kept by IHSAA, state tourney introduced in 1971)
 Track (1): 1933 (one class) 
 Golf (3): 1975, 1976, 1992 (A, now 5A)  (introduced in 1956)
 Soccer (4): 1985, 2018, 2019, 2022
 Wrestling (2): 2015, 2016
 Football (1): 2021

Girls
 Basketball (1): 2001 (A-1 Div II, now 4A)  (introduced in 1976)
 Golf (2):  2003, 2004 (4A)  (introduced in 1987)

Notable graduates
Joe Albertson, founder of Albertson's supermarkets and a notable philanthropist, class of 1925 
Paul Revere Dick, professionally known as Paul Revere, entrepreneur and founder of Paul Revere & the Raiders, class of 1956.
Mike Garman, MLB pitcher, class of 1967  
Shirley Englehorn, pro golfer, won 1970 LPGA Championship, class of 1958 
Jimmy Johnston, NFL running back & end, class of 1935
Dean McAdams, NFL player
Ray McDonald, NFL running back, class of 1963
Cody Pickett, NFL and CFL quarterback, class of 1999
Frank Reberger, MLB pitcher, class of 1962
Steve Symms, former U.S. Senator, class of 1956
Randy Trautman, College Football Hall of Fame inductee, CFL defensive lineman, class of 1978

References

External links

Caldwell School District #132
Great Schools, Inc: Caldwell Senior High School
MaxPreps.com - Caldwell Cougars

Public high schools in Idaho
Schools in Canyon County, Idaho
Treasure Valley
Caldwell, Idaho
1910 establishments in Idaho
School buildings completed in 1956